Arbor View High School is a high school in northwestern unincorporated Clark County, Nevada, United States that opened in 2005.
 It is part of the Clark County School District.

Architecture
Arbor View was built at a total cost of $54 million, with construction beginning in March 2004 and completion occurring in August 2005. It was one of ten new schools that opened in the school district in 2005, one of the fastest-growing school zones in the nation.

Arbor View High School is an architectural prototype, featuring a mall-style design with four two-story corner "houses" and a shared central esplanade. The layout is intended to help foster the feeling of a "small school environment", in the words of interim co-superintendent Walt Rulffes, even though it is by far the largest school in the history of the Clark County district. The structure is more energy-efficient than existing schools within the district.

The design for this school received a 2005 AIA Nevada Excellence in Design Award merit award for a completed structure. The architecture was designed by the Tate Snyder Kimsey Architects.

Sports facilities
The school is one of three in Las Vegas that has a synthetic turf football field. It is a grassy style turf that is the exact type that is used in the NFL. This cuts down on facilities used in order to maintain the large field.

References

External links
School website
Clark county School District

Clark County School District
Educational institutions established in 2005
High schools in Clark County, Nevada
2005 establishments in Nevada
Public high schools in Nevada